The 1897 college baseball season, play of college baseball in the United States began in the spring of 1897.  Play largely consisted of regional matchups, some organized by conferences, and ended in June.  No national championship event was held until 1947.

New programs
Arkansas, Kansas State, and Tennessee played their first varsity seasons.

Conference standings
The following is an incomplete list of conference standings:

Conference winners
This is a partial list of conference champions from the 1897 season.

References